The Brokpa, sometimes referred to as Minaro, are a small ethnic group mostly found in the union territory of Ladakh, India around the villages of Dha and Hanu. Some of the community are also located across the Line of Control in Baltistan in the villages around Ganokh. They speak an Indo-Aryan language called Brokskat. The Brokpa are mostly Vajrayana Buddhist while some are Muslim.

Name 
According to the British Raj commentators,  the name 'Brogpa' was given by the Baltis to the Dardic people living among them. The term means "highlander". The reason for this is that the Brogpa tended to occupy the higher pasture lands in the valleys. Frederic Drew states, "Wherever the Dards are in contact with Baltis or with Bhots, these others call them (...) Brokpa or Blokpa." As the Tibetan language pronunciation varies by region, the same name is pronounced by Ladakhis as Drokpa or Dokpa.

Over time, the term "Brokpa" fell out of use in Baltistan and the Drass area, in favour of ethnic labels such as "Dards" and "Shins". Only the Brokpa of the lower Indus valley in Ladakh Dah Hanu region continue to retain the name, and their language is called Brokskat. They  use the endonym Minaro.

Identity and geographic distribution 
The Brokpa speak an Indo-Aryan language called Brokskat, which is a variety of the Shina language currently spoken in the Gilgit region. (During the British Raj, it became common to refer to the people of the Gilgit region "Dards" using ancient nomenclature. The Brokpa are thus "Dards" living in the midst of Tibetic Ladakhi and Balti people.) While the two languages share similar phonological developments, Brokskat converged with Purgi to the extent of being mutually intelligible at the present time.

The Brokpa might have expanded from the Gilgit region upstream along the Indus valley until reaching their current habitat, viz., the lower Indus valley of Ladakh next to the border with Baltistan. The time frame of this expansion or dispersion is uncertain, but their chiefs are believed to have ruled at Khalatse until the 12th century, where the remnants of their forts can still be found. Their rule over this region ended during the reign of the Ladakhi kings Lhachen Utpala and his successor Lhachen Naglug.

Another group of Brokpa appear to have settled in the Turtuk region in the lower Shyok river valley, where also remnants of their fort can be found. They appear to have faced a defeat at the hands of raiders from Baltistan, and moved to the Hanu valley below the Chorbat La pass.

Scholar Rohit Vohra states that the Brokpa can be found all along the Indus Valley from Leh, but Achina-Thang is the first wholly Brokpa village, however they have adopted Ladakhi culture  a long ago . Their major villages are, in addition to Dah and Hanu, Garkon, Darchik, and Batalik.A few of them  lives in the villages of Silmo and Lalung en route to Kargil. In the 17th century, the stream and village of Gurugurdo was set as the border between Baltistan and Ladakh. To the north of here, there are Muslim Brokpa villages, such as  Chulichan,Ganokh and possibly Marol. Ganokh and Marol are at present in Pakistan-administered Kashmir (as part of Gilgit-Baltistan).

The number of Brokstat speakers was estimated as 3,000 people in 1996.

Festivals

Brokpa celebrate Bono-na festival which is a festival of thank giving to deities for good crops and prosperity.

Diet
The traditional Brogpa diet is based on locally grown foods such as barley and hardy wheat prepared most often as tsampa/sattu (roasted flour). It takes in different ways. Other important foods include potatoes, radishes, turnips, and Gur-Gur Cha, a brewed tea made of black tea, butter and salt.

Dairy and poultry sources are not eaten because of religious taboos. Brogpa eat three meals a day: Choalu Unis (breakfast), Beali (lunch) and Rata Unis (dinner). Brogpa vary with respect to the amount of meat (mainly mutton) that they eat. A household's economic position decides the consumption of meat. It is only during festivals and rituals that all have greater access to mutton.

Economy and employment
The Brogpa economy has shifted from agropastoralism to wage labor, and the division of labor that relied on stratifications of age and gender is now obsolete. The Brogpa transition to private property, monogamy, nuclear families, formal education, wage labor, and their incorporation into a highly militarized economy of soldiering and portering illuminates the complex workings of modernity in Ladakh.

See also
 Shina people
 Nuristani people
 Kalash people
 Hunza people
 Gurjar people

Notes

References

Bibliography

External links

The Far East in Words and Pictures
 
 

Ethnic groups in Ladakh
Social groups of Jammu and Kashmir
Ethnic groups in India